Leichhardt is a suburb of Ipswich in the City of Ipswich, Queensland, Australia.

Geography 
The suburb is bounded to the south-west by the Bremer River, to the south by the Old Toowoomba Road, and to the north-east by the Bremer River again.

Ipswich Golf Course occupies  in the south-west of the suburb adjacent to the river.

History
The Ipswich Golf Club opened in 1898 as a membership-based organisation. It went into receivership in 2013 and was purchased by Terry Morris (founder of Sirromet Wines) and Dean Merrell.

St Mark's Anglican Church opened circa 1935. Its closure on 15 November 1998 by Assistant Bishop Ray Smith.

The suburb name was assigned following a request by local residents to the City of Ipswich in 1953. It is named after Friedrich Wilhelm Ludwig Leichhardt, an explorer and naturalist from Prussia (now known as Germany). He led major expeditions throughout Australia. 

Leichhardt Methodist Church was officially opened on Saturday 5 September 1953 by Reverend John Egerton Jacob. The church building was not new but the relocated Methodist Church from Birkwood (now within Coleyville / Warrill View) which opened 77 years earlier in 1876 but the congregation had subsequently declined. With the amalgamation of the Methodist Church into the Uniting Church in Australia in 1977, it became Leichhardt Uniting Church. It was demolished in 2018. It was at 13 Chubb Street, now within the suburb boundaries of One Mile. 

Leichhardt State School opened on 1 August 1956.

Immaculate Heart of Mary Catholic Church opened in 1958 at 22 Old Toowoomba Road; it is now within the suburb boundaries of neighbouring One Mile.

Immaculate Heart of Mary Catholic Primary School opened on 23 January 1967; it is now within the suburb boundaries of neighbouring One Mile.

The unemployment rate of Leichhardt was 17.1%, in comparison to the Australian unemployment rate of 6.9%.

Education 
Leichhardt State School is a government primary (Prep-6) school for boys and girls at 72 Samford Road. In 2018, the school had an enrolment of 346 students with 26 teachers (23 full-time equivalent) and 29 non-teaching staff (17 full-time equivalent). It includes a special education program.

Amenities 
The Ipswich Golf Club is an 18-hole golf course. The par-72 championship course was designed by Wayne Grady . The clubhouse has a pro-shop, changing rooms, bistro and bar.

References

External links
 University of Queensland: Queensland Places: Leichhardt

Suburbs of Ipswich, Queensland